Blackwell is an unincorporated community in Morris Township, Tioga County, in the U.S. state of Pennsylvania. Babb Creek enters Pine Creek at Blackwell, in the Pine Creek Gorge. The Pine Creek Rail Trail passes through Blackwell.

References

Unincorporated communities in Tioga County, Pennsylvania
Unincorporated communities in Pennsylvania